Wee Wee Monsieur is a 1938 short subject directed by Del Lord starring American slapstick comedy team The Three Stooges (Moe Howard, Larry Fine and Curly Howard). It is the 29th entry in the series released by Columbia Pictures starring the comedians, who released 190 shorts for the studio between 1934 and 1959.

Plot
The Stooges are artists (Moe is a sculptor, Larry is a music composer, and Curly is a painter) living in Paris. When the landlord (Harry Semels) comes after the overdue rent and calls the Parisian police and have them thrown in the Bastille forever for not paying the overdue rent, the boys skip out and wind up accidentally joining the French Foreign Legion that they confuse with the American Legion. Posted to the desert, their assignment is to guard Captain Gorgonzola (William Irving) from the natives. When the captain is kidnapped, the boys are given a chance to bring him back alive.

The Stooges make their way to the town where the captain was taken, all disguised as Santa Claus (complete with a sleigh and a reindeer). Despite the disguise not working, they are able to quickly knock out a guard who confronted them and make their way further into town. Ultimately, they find their captain held by an evil sheik named Tsimmis (Vernon Dent) who is trying to offer him expensive jewelry and a harem of beautiful women in exchange for the Legion's ammunition. The trio are forced to disguise themselves again as part of the harem and use an opportunity during a dance to render the sheik and his head bodyguard unconscious. The four then escape, but end up coming across a lion's den. Before the lion could eat them, Curly is able to placate it into drawing them on a wagon back to their camp.

Cast

Credited
 Moe Howard as Moe
 Larry Fine as Larry
 Curly Howard as Curly

Uncredited
 Jean De Briac as Gendarme
 Eugene Borden as Enlistment Officer
 Vernon Dent as Simitz - Arab Chief
 William Irving as Captain Gorgonzola
 Bud Jamison as Sergeant
 John Lester Johnson as Harem Guard 
 Ethelreda Leopold as Harem Girl from Brooklyn
 Ida May as Homely Harem Girl
 Alex Novinsky as Street Peddler
 John Rand as Man in Street
 Harry Semels as Landlord 
 Victor Travers as Man walking by Legion HQ
 Tanner The Lion as Lion
  Bert Young as Palace Sentry

Quotes
[Curly has just put his painting on the landlord]
Moe: Come on.
[He, Larry and Curly make their escape as the landlord is left spinning around.]
Landlord: Police. Police. Police. Police.
[A Gendarme in a barrel overhears the call of the landlord and runs over.]
Landlord: Gendarme. Gendarme.

Production notes
Wee Wee Monsieur was filmed on November 12–17, 1937. The film's title is a parody of "Oui, oui, Monsieur" (French for "Yes, sir").

The lion at the end of the short is Tanner, the (at the time) mascot for Metro-Goldwyn Mayer. Tanner previously appeared in Movie Maniacs (2 years before this film was released).

References

External links 
 
 

1938 films
1938 comedy films
1938 short films
The Three Stooges films
American black-and-white films
Films directed by Del Lord
Films about the French Foreign Legion
Columbia Pictures short films
American comedy short films
Films set in Paris
1930s English-language films
1930s American films